Manzil is a 1960 Bollywood film directed by Mandi Burman. It stars the popular duo Dev Anand and Nutan in the leading roles. Krishan Dhawan, Achala Sachdev and K.N. Singh star in supporting roles. It was declared "average", taking the seventeenth spot at highest grossing, earning 760,000 rupees at the box office.

Plot
Set in Simla in 1929, Rajkumar Mehta (Dev Anand), or Raju as he is lovingly called, has just returned from England. He meets his childhood friend Pushpa (Nutan), and tells her about the situation at home. Raju's father Mehta (K.N. Singh) wanted him to continue with the family business, but Raju ended up learning music instead. This leads to constant tiffs between the two, as Mehta considers music a profession for beggars. Raju doesn't show it, but he is in love with Pushpa, and she loves him back. More trouble stirs when Captain Prem Nath (Krishan Dhawan) expresses his will to marry Pushpa.

Raju and Pushpa go to a bar one night, and meet the Captain there. The Captain doesn't recognize Raju, and Raju starts playing on the piano, evidently jealous. Pushpa somehow convinces the Captain to go away, and the two sing Aye Kash Chalte Milke. A few days later, when the Captain comes visiting, (Pushpa is staying in Raju's house), he recognizes Raju, and says that when he saw him play the piano at the bar, he thought Raju was the bandmaster. Mehta hears this and is enraged. A few hours later, Raju comes out of his room, only to see his piano being thrown out. In a fit of rage, Raju leaves the house for Bombay.

Pushpa tries to convince him not to go, but Raju leaves anyway, and promises to take her along when he becomes successful. In Bombay, Raju struggles to find accommodation, and a tourist guide he meets ends up robbing him. Thankfully, the paan-seller offers him a room, and a wealthy prostitute Titlibai (Zebunissa) comes looking for Raju. She takes him to her house, impressed by his performance, and tries to woo him. Raju slowly starts to find success, but resists Titlibai's advances towards him. Embittered, Titlibai destroys the letters between Raju and Pushpa.

One day, Pushpa's mother (Pratima Devi), asks her brother Mangal (Badri Prasad) to check up on Raju. Mangal comes back and tells Pushpa that he saw Raju in the company of a prostitute. Pushpa refuses to believe her uncle and goes to Bombay, only to see the same. Shattered, she returns and marries the Captain.

Finally, Raju becomes successful, and after composing the music score for a film, returns to Simla, only to see Pushpa getting married. His sister, Shoba Mehta (Achala Sachdev) sees him, and Raju is shocked when she tells him that Pushpa saw him with Titlibai and thought she had lost him for good. Raju becomes an alcoholic, and doesn't care for his newfound wealth or fame. Pushpa, too, is unhappy with her marriage, because she still loves Raju, but tries to be faithful to her husband.

Raju finally meets Pushpa, and denies having any relationship with Titlibai. Before Pushpa can say anything, the Captain finds them together. Believing that Pushpa was cheating on him, he draws a gun and tries to shoot Raju. Will the Captain succeed or will the two lovers be united?

Cast
Dev Anand as Rajkumar Mehta "Raju"
Nutan as Pushpa
K. N. Singh as Mr. Mehta
Achala Sachdev as Shobha Mehta
Mehmood as Shankar Paanwala

Music
The music of Manzil wasn't a big hit when it was released, but now it is considered one of the best works of S.D. Burman. Two songs in particular, Ae Kaash Chalte Milke and Chupke Se Mile Pyaase Pyaase, are regarded as classics. The lyrics were penned by Majrooh Sultanpuri.

Songs

References

External links
 

1960s Hindi-language films
1960s Urdu-language films
Films scored by S. D. Burman
1960 films
Urdu-language Indian films